Erycina is a genus of flowering plants from the orchid family, Orchidaceae. Its species are native to Mexico, Central America, South America and Trinidad.

Erycina crista-galli (Rchb.f.) N.H.Williams & M.W.Chase
Erycina echinata (Kunth) Lindl.
Erycina glossomystax (Rchb.f.) N.H.Williams & M.W.Chase
Erycina hyalinobulbon (Lex.) N.H.Williams & M.W.Chase
Erycina pumilio (Rchb.f.) N.H.Williams & M.W.Chase
Erycina pusilla (L.) N.H.Williams & M.W.Chase
Erycina zamorensis (Dodson) N.H.Williams & M.W.Chase

See also
 List of Orchidaceae genera

References

 Pridgeon, A.M., Cribb, P.J., Chase, M.A. & Rasmussen, F. eds. (1999). Genera Orchidacearum Vols 1–3. Oxford Univ. Press.
 Berg Pana, H. 2005. Handbuch der Orchideen-Namen. Dictionary of Orchid Names. Dizionario dei nomi delle orchidee. Ulmer, Stuttgart.

External links
 
 

Oncidiinae genera
Oncidiinae